Bajo el signo de Caín (English: Under the sign of Cain) is the twelfth album from Latin music singer-songwriter Miguel Bosé.  Released on June 8, 1993, it was his fifth full-length album for the WEA Latina label.

Track listing

Track Notes
As the lyrics are rather stream of consciousness, Bosé wrote a sentence or two as a dedication for certain people at the end of each song.

Te comería el corazón
A ti que acabas de llegar...
No podré salir de este rincón más que a través de la espada y mirándote a los ojos. (To you who have just arrived in this world... I will not be able to leave except through the sword and staring at you in the eyes.)

Lo que hay es lo que ves
A Javier, Edith & Manolo mis amigos del alma y de la carretera... y de muchas otras cosas más también. (To Javier, Edith & Manolo; my friends of the soul and highway... and many other things as well.)

Si tú no vuelves
A la Mami y a Pablito, con ellas buscando estrellas. (To Mami and Pablito; with them looking for stars.)

Nada particular
A Mahala, Javier, Pepe & Rafa porque con vosotros, nunca me siento en el exilio.  (To Mahala, Javier & Pepe, because with them, I never feel alone.)

Mayo
En memoria de un Mayo, revolucionario de corazón. (In memory of May, revolutionary at heart.)

Bajo el signo de Caín
A mis hermanos Nacho el Delfín, y Nacho el de las Alas Mediterráneas. A mi Padre, el Maestro.  (To my brothers Nacho the Dolphin, and Nacho the one of the Mediterranean wings. And to my father, the Maestro.)

Wako-Shaman
A Bimba, Olfo, Nicolás & Jara... Que aprendáis a cuidar de esta tierra que es vuestra única casa.  (To Bimba, Olfo, Nicolás & Jara... Learn to take care of this land, as it is your only home.)

Imagínate que te quiero
A Lucía y Carlos por ser éste vuestro retrato cotidiano.  (To Lucía and Carlos, for being this your daily picture.)

Sara
A la Tata y a Nunu que saben mejor que nadie cuidar de todas las sarasituaciones...(To Tata and Nunu, who know better than anyone how to take care of Sara-situations...)

Sol forastero
A Andrea...Te acuerdas? A Cecilia que me entiende.  (To Andrea; do you remember? To Cecilia who understands me.)

La americana
A Chacho y a todos mis compañeros de infancia...  (To Chacho and all my childhood friends...)

Gota a gota
A los mercenarios de rumores y calumnias, raza despreciable que ya rebosó el vaso. Quien se pique ajos coma... (To the mercenaries of rumors and catastrophes; the despicable race that makes my glass overflow.[i.e. the last straw]  Those who mash garlic....eat them...)

Personnel
Miguel Bosé: vocals
Sol Pilas, Andrea Bronston, Juan Canovas, Jose MaGuzman, Maisa Hens, Wuebo, Edith Salazar: backing vocals
Ross Cullum: guitars, keyboards, piano, bass, drums, percussion, soprano saxophone, trumpet
Sandy McLelland: acoustic guitars, keyboards, Hammond organ, drums, percussion, backing vocals
Andy Ross: guitars, bass, keyboards, drums, percussion
Vicente Amigo: Spanish guitar
Bryn Haworth: slide guitar
Naresh Ali Khan: violin
Antonio Carmona: Flamenco accordion
Javier Catala: electric guitars
Gino Pavone: percussion

Production
Producers - Ross Cullum and Sandy McLelland
Production Assistant – Andy Ross
Recording and mixing - Ross Cullum, Sandy McLelland and Avril Mackintosh
Editing - Dick Beetham
Mastering - Kevin Metcalfe

Certifications and sales

References

1993 albums
Miguel Bosé albums
Warner Records albums